Jaime Serrano Alonso (born 30 April 1979 in Barcelona) is an S9 swimmer from Spain. He competed at the 2000 Summer Paralympics in Sydney, winning a gold medal and World Record in the 400 meter freestyle race and a silver medal in the 200 meter individual medley race.

He swam with the Spanish paralympic team between 1997 and 2002 in three European championships, two world championships and in the Sydney Paralympic Games.

References

External links 
 
 

1979 births
Living people
Spanish male freestyle swimmers
Spanish male medley swimmers
Paralympic swimmers of Spain
Paralympic gold medalists for Spain
Paralympic silver medalists for Spain
Paralympic medalists in swimming
Swimmers at the 2000 Summer Paralympics
Medalists at the 2000 Summer Paralympics
Swimmers from Barcelona
S9-classified Paralympic swimmers
Medalists at the World Para Swimming Championships